Luis Antonio Regalado Reyes (January 10, 1922 – 2001) was a Salvadoran footballer and coach.

Club career
Regalado played for Salvadoran league clubs Libertad, Espana, Luis Ángel Firpo and Atlético Marte.

International career
Nicknamed Loco (crazy), Regalado made his debut for El Salvador in a December 1943 CCCF Championship match against Guatemala and has earned a total of 62 caps, scoring 3 goals. These numbers include non-official matches. His final game for his country was on 19 June 1955.

References

External links
Leyendas Luis Regalado - LAFirpo fanspace 

1922 births
2001 deaths
People from La Unión Department
Association football midfielders
Salvadoran footballers
El Salvador international footballers
C.D. Luis Ángel Firpo footballers
C.D. Atlético Marte footballers
Salvadoran football managers
C.D. Luis Ángel Firpo managers